Tazio Roversi (21 March 1947 – 17 October 1999) was an Italian footballer who played as a defender. On 20 November 1971, he represented the Italy national football team on the occasion of a friendly match against Austria in a 2–2 home draw.

Honours

Player
Bologna
Serie A: 1963–64
Coppa Italia: 1969–70, 1973–74

References

1947 births
1999 deaths
Italian footballers
Italy international footballers
Association football defenders
Bologna F.C. 1909 players
Hellas Verona F.C. players
A.C. Carpi players